This was a new event on the 2013 ITF Women's Circuit.

Timea Bacsinszky and Kristina Barrois won the tournament, defeating Anna Morgina and Kateřina Siniaková in the final, 6–7(5–7), 6–0, [10–4].

Seeds

Draw

References 
 Draw

Soho Square Ladies Tournament - Doubles